Hydropneumothorax is defined as the presence of both air and fluid within the pleural space. An upright chest x-ray will show air fluid levels. The horizontal fluid level is usually well defined and extends across the whole length of one of the hemithorax.

Signs and symptoms 
This can be remembered by the 4 'S':
straight line dullness,
shifting dullness,
splash,
sound of coin.

Causes 
 Iatrogenic: Introduction of air during pleural fluid aspiration in effusion
 Presence of a gas-forming organism
 Thoracic trauma

Diagnosis
Diagnosis can be via CXR. CT is better to outline borders of air fluid levels, however, CT has a greater radiation exposure.

Treatment
Treatment includes ICD (intercostal drainage) of fluid and air and treatment of underlying conditions.

References

External links 

Diseases of pleura